The Wiener Jeunesse Orchester (WJO, Vienna Youth Orchestra) is the national youth orchestra of Austria, founded 1987 in Vienna. It consists of students between 18 and 26 years of age from all Austrian states.

The WJO has worked with conductors including Atso Almila, John Axelrod, Asher Fisch, Valery Gergiev, Manfred Honeck, Rupert Huber, Lutz Köhler, Gérard Korsten, Daniel Meyer, Andrés Orozco-Estrada, Andrea Quinn and Johannes Wildner.

It is a member of the European Federation of National Youth Orchestras.

See also 
 List of youth orchestras

References 

Music education organizations
National youth orchestras
Austrian orchestras
European youth orchestras
Musical groups established in 1987